Tunisia competed at the 1968 Summer Olympics in Mexico City, Mexico.

Medalists

Gold
 Mohammed Gammoudi — Athletics Men's 5000 metres

Bronze
 Mohammed Gammoudi — Athletics Men's 10000 metres

Athletics

Men
Track & road events

Boxing

Men

References
Official Olympic Reports
International Olympic Committee results database

1968 in Tunisian sport
Nations at the 1968 Summer Olympics
1968